Graceful Friends is a South Korean television series starring Yoo Jun-sang, Song Yoon-ah, Bae Soo-bin, Han Eun-jung, Kim Sung-oh, Kim Hye-eun, Jung Suk-yong, Lee In-hye, Kim Won-hae and Kim Ji-young. It aired on JTBC from July 10 to September 5, 2020. It's available for streaming on Netflix and Disney+ in selected countries.

Synopsis
The peaceful life of a group of friends who have known each other for 20 years is suddenly broken when a murder takes place.

Ahn Goong-chul (Yoo Jun-sang) has a seemingly perfect life with his beautiful wife and son. He works diligently for a food franchise company and is a loving husband and father to his family. Goong-chul's wife, Nam Jung-hae (Song Yoon-ah) is a psychiatrist who works in a family hospital. She is intelligent and beautiful but hides a dark past from her husband. Jung-hae gets entangled in a blackmailing scheme.

Jung Jae-hoon (Bae Soo-bin) is a divorced urologist with a wealthy family background. He lives alone and seems to have a mysterious side. He has a past connection to Nam Jung-hae, of which Ahn Goong-chul is ignorant.

Jo Hyung-woo (Kim Sung-oh) is an adult film director who is often mockingly called the "Bong Joon-ho" of the adult film industry. His dream is to become a mainstream big budget film director but he has never had any luck in achieving his goal. He is married to Kang Kyung-ja (Kim Hye-eun) who is a former adult film actress and now runs a luxury bar. He is very dependent on his wife's income. Kang Kyung-ja has a pro-golfer son named Kang Ji-wook.

Park Choon-bok (Jung Suk-yong) is an insurance company worker and part-time worker at a foreign car dealership. His wife Yoo Eun-sil (Lee In-hye) is a housewife and they have a daughter named Park Pu-reum. He looks comparatively older than his friends and wife, and people often mistakenly think he is his daughter's grandfather. He struggles financially but his wife is very supportive.

Cheon Man-shik (Kim Won-hae) is a City Hall Tax Collection Division official with a wife and a teenage daughter. He is quiet and polite and suffers from depression. He and Ahn Goong-chul were roommates in college and consider each other best friends. He has been hiding a secret from his family and friends which is revealed only after his death.

Baek Hae-sook (Han Eun-jung) used to be friends with the five and they all used to have a crush on her in college. For some reason, she had to drop out of college and wasn't in touch with any of them until Man-shik's funeral. She buys a restaurant near the housing society where the five friends live, and seems to have a mysterious agenda.

Cast

Main
 Yoo Jun-sang as Ahn Goong-chul
 Kwon Hyuk as young Ahn Goong-chul
 Song Yoon-ah as Nam Jung-hae
 Joo Da-young as young Nam Jung-hae
 Bae Soo-bin as Jung Jae-hoon
 Han Min as young Jung Jae-hoon
 Han Eun-jung as Baek Hae-sook
 Choi Soo-jung as young Baek Hae-sook
 Kim Sung-oh as Jo Hyung-woo
 Choi Dae-han as young Jo Hyung-woo
 Kim Hye-eun as Kang Kyung-ja
 Jung Suk-yong as Park Choon-bok
 Lee In-hye as Yoo Eun-sil
 Kim Won-hae as Cheon Man-shik
 Park Sung-joon as young Cheon Man-shik
 Kim Ji-young as Ji Myung-sook

Supporting
 Lee Tae-hwan as Joo Kang-san
 A professional golf instructor who cons people to extract money for his gambling addiction.
 Kim Ji-sung as Na Ae-ra / Kang Mi-ra
 An adult film actress who is blackmailed by Joo Kang-san to help him scam people.
 Yeon Je-hyung as Kang Ji-wook
 Kang Kyung-ja's son and Jo Hyung-woo's stepson, he is a pro golfer. Like his stepfather, he also was Kang-san's blackmail victim.
Kim Ji-young as Cheon Soo-ah
 Man-shik and Myung-sook's teenage daughter who studies in Canada.
 Park Ha-joon as Ahn Yoo-bin
 Goong-chul and Jung-hae's son.
 Shim Hye-yeon as Park Pu-reum 
 Choon-bok and Eun-sil's daughter, she has an innocent crush on Ahn Yoo-bin.
 Kim Seung-wook as Jo Tae-wook
 Detective working on the murder case who also were in charge of Professor Park's murder case.
 Kim Hee-ryung as Goo Young-sun
 An Alzheimer patient whom Man-sik took care of. She is the wife of Professor Park Do-hoon.
 Sa Kang as Do Do-hae 
 She is the caregiver of Goo Young-sun and liked Cheon Man-shik.
 Lee Yeon-doo as Choi Mo-ran
 Jung Jae-hoon's ex-wife. She moved to America after their divorce and returned with a changed appearance.

Others
 Lee Joo-suk as Professor Han Eung-shik
 Jang Hee-soo as Oh Soon-jung, chairwoman of the hospital Nam Jung-hae works in.
 Kim Ga-hwa as Geum Ha-na, Jung Jae-hoon's colleague.
 Um Chae-young as Moon Ga-yeon, Ahn Yoo-bin's friend.
 Kim Dong-ho as Seo Joo-won, Joo Kang-san's friend.
 Kim Tae-young as Professor Park Do-hoon
 Sung Byung-sook as Ahn Goong-chul's mother.
 Kwon Hyuk as Ahn Goong-cheol
 Jeon Eun-mi
 Yoo Gun
 Kang Nam-gil
 Lee Geung-young
 Kim Jun-hyun as himself, Goong-chul's friend and brand ambassador of the chicken franchise where he works.

Production
On January 18, 2020, it was reported that JTBC picked up the series which had already wrapped up filming.

Viewership

International broadcast
The series is available on iQIYI with multi-languages subtitles in South East Asia and Taiwan.

The series is also being aired on K-Plus beginning February 27, 2021.

It is available to stream on Netflix and Disney+ in selected markets.

References

External links
  
 
 
 

JTBC television dramas
Korean-language television shows
2020 South Korean television series debuts
2020 South Korean television series endings
South Korean mystery television series
South Korean pre-produced television series
Television series by Next Entertainment World
Television series by JTBC Studios